The Roberto Ribas Lange State Park is a State park in the state of Paraná, Brazil.
It protects an area holding remnants of Atlantic Forest.

Location

The Roberto Ribas Lange State Park is divided between the municipalities of Antonina (28.77%), Campina Grande do Sul (9.75%) and Morretes (61.48%) in Paraná.
As of 2016 the park was not open to visitors.
It adjoins the  Pico Paraná State Park to the south.
The conservation unit is part of the Lagamar Mosaic.

History

The Agudo da Cotia State Park was created by decree 7.301 of 24 September 1990.
Of this,  belonged to the Agudos da Cotia State Park, which was revoked.
The objective is to protect remnants of Atlantic Forest, and their biodiversity.
Administrative responsibility was given to the Environmental Institute of Paraná (IAP).

Notes

Sources

State parks of Brazil
Protected areas of Paraná (state)
1994 establishments in Brazil